Cissus elegans is a species of flowering plants in the family Vitaceae.

References

External links

 
 Cissus elegans at Tropicos (retrieved 23 July 2016)

elegans
Plants described in 1869